Nigerian singer Yemi Alade's discography consists of five studio albums, two extended plays, fifty-nine singles, four promotional singles, fifty-two music videos, and two cameo appearances.

Albums

Extended plays

Singles

Promotional singles

Cameo appearances 
List of non-single cameo appearances, with other performing artists, showing year released and album name

Music videos

As lead artist

As featured artist

References 

Discographies of Nigerian artists